Kasriel Hirsch Sarasohn (born Paiser, Suwalki Province, Congress Poland, 1835  died New York City, Jan. 12, 1905) was an American journalist who published several newspapers in New York.

Biography
In 1866, Sarasohn abandoned his preparation for the rabbinate and emigrated to the United States, settling in New York City. In 1874, he founded the Jewish Weekly and the Jewish Gazette, and in 1886, the Jewish Daily News. When he began the publication of his journals,  there were no other Jewish papers printed in Hebrew in the United States, and he had great difficulty in obtaining the necessary typefaces. Eventually, his newspapers became the most popular in the Orthodox Jewish community.

Charitable works
In 1882, Sarasohn founded the Hebrew Sheltering House, now known as the Hebrew Shelter House and Home for the Aged. In 1901, he visited Palestine, and on his return was elected president of the committee for the collection of funds for the support of the poor in Palestine. He was chairman of the committee for the Kishinev sufferers. He was Vice-President of the Union of Orthodox Congregations of America. He was active in the Hebrew Immigrant Aid Society.

References

Goldman, Yosef, Hebrew Printing in America (YGBooks 2006)

Hebrew Printing in America
Jewish printing and publishing
Congress Poland emigrants to the United States
1835 births
1905 deaths